Sävast is a village located in Boden Municipality, Norrbotten County, Sweden. It had a population of 3,148 in 2010.

References

External links

Populated places in Boden Municipality
Norrbotten